Back to the Garden is a tribute album to Joni Mitchell, released in 1992. It was released on Intrepid Records, after the Canadian chart success of their 1991 Bruce Cockburn tribute, Kick at the Darkness.

The album's first single was Sloan's rendition of "A Case of You", from Mitchell's 1971 album Blue. It was followed up by Squiddly's rap-infused rendition of "Blonde in the Bleachers".

Track listing
 "Free Man in Paris" – Big Faith
 "This Flight Tonight" – Sara Craig
 "Carey" – Universal Honey
 "Big Yellow Taxi" – Lorraine Scott
 "Black Crow" – Molly Johnson
 "The Beat of Black Wings" – Andy Stochansky
 "Shades of Scarlett Conquering" – Martha and the Muffins
 "The Hissing of Summer Lawns" – Funky Bummer
 "River" – Hugh Marsh, Jon Goldsmith, Rob Piltch and Martin Tielli 1
 "You Turn Me On, I'm a Radio" – Kurt Swinghammer
 "Coyote" – Spirit of the West
 "Woodstock" – W.O.W.
 "Night in the City" – Jenny Whiteley
 "A Case of You" – Sloan
 "Blonde in the Bleachers" – Squiddly with Maria del Mar
 "Songs to Aging Children Come" – John Cody and Marti Jones
 "Refuge of the Roads" – Laura Hubert and Art Bergmann

Notes

1 These four musicians subsequently formed the group Nick Buzz in 1994, but were credited as individuals on this album.

References

1992 compilation albums
Compilation albums by Canadian artists
Folk compilation albums
Folk rock compilation albums
Joni Mitchell tribute albums